"All Fall Down" is the second single from Ultravox's 1986 album U-Vox, released on 19 November 1986.

The song's lyrics carry a strong anti-war sentiment. The Chieftains also guest-performed on All Fall Down.

Background 

Ure said in 1986: 'Although we said it before, the main difference is that we´ve no barriers whatsoever, we let its song and its arrangement dictate what that song should sound like. So a song like "All Fall Down" was like you´d imagine a Jacques Brel Celtic protest song to sound, it has a very strong celtic folk feel, with acoustic guitars and instruments. So we used Chieftains on it, went over to Dublin to record them. Although at the time the idea sounded really bizarre, the combination of us and them, a band who supposedly uses technology to its utmost and this band who uses no technology at all, that combination works really well.'

Ure said in 2012: 'The album "U-VOX" is a mess and displays a band falling apart, but in "All Fall Down" we successfully gather ourselves together with folk band The Chieftains in a very easy and powerful folk song.'

Structure 

The song consists of two verses and an instrumental theme. It has no (sung) chorus.
After the first verse, the theme is introduced and repeated one time.
After the second verse, the theme is played as a coda and repeated for about 3 minutes, then faded out. The first and the last note of the theme are identical. In the coda, different from the introduction, the theme begins again with the last note of the preceding repetition; i.e. the theme actually never ends since, when the last note has been played, the next repetition has already begun.

Release details 

The B-side is "Dreams?", an ambient medley with a spoken-word part near the end, asking questions about dreams. Midge Ure has since stated that he recorded this straight from a radio show.

The single came with a free bonus single with a live version of All Fall Down, performed at Wembley Arena in November 1986. From the same concert is a live version of U-Vox track "Dream On" as the b-side.

"All Fall Down" peaked at number 30 on the UK Singles Chart.

Track listing

7" version
 "All Fall Down" – 5:07
 "Dreams?" – 2:30

12" version
 "All Fall Down (Extended Mix)" – 7:40
 "Dreams?" – 2:30
 "All Fall Down (Instrumental)" – 5:34

7" bonus single
 "All Fall Down  (live 6 Nov 86 at Wembley Arena, London)" – 5:36
 "Dream On (live 6 Nov 86 at Wembley Arena, London)" – 3:47

References 

1986 singles
1986 songs
Ultravox songs
Music videos directed by Godley and Creme
Songs written by Midge Ure
Songs written by Chris Cross
Songs written by Billy Currie